Hereward de Havilland (2 December 1894 in Nuneaton, Warwickshire – 12 September 1976 in Australia) was a pioneer British aviator, test pilot and member of the de Havilland company.  One of the three sons of Rev. Charles de Havilland, he was the younger brother of Geoffrey de Havilland. Actresses Olivia de Havilland and Joan Fontaine were his cousins. He had a son Peter Adam de Havilland (m. Barabara Bolt) and grandchildren John and Joanna de Havilland.

Hereward and his brothers Geoffrey and Ivon had a mechanical workshop at their home at the rectory in Crux Easton near Newbury. Geoffrey's first flight took place with Frank Hearle and Hereward in 1909 at Seven Barrows in Dorset. They practised at their grandfather's farm Medley Manor near Port Meadow just outside Oxford.

De Havilland flew in various air campaigns in Europe and the Middle East in World War I and reached the rank of Major.  On 10 March 1917, he was awarded a DSO for distinguished service in the field in Mesopotamia, the youngest airman at that time to receive the DSO. He was awarded a bar to his DSO later that same year.

In March 1927, he established de Havilland Australia, the first overseas subsidiary of the de Havilland company.

He flew solo in the 1929 Western Australian Centenary Air Race in a modified de Havilland DH.60 Moth, named "Black Hawk", coming second on handicap and winning the £300 fastest overall time prize in 22 hours 50 minutes 23 seconds and averaging . The same year he joined the board of Airspeed Ltd. at Christchurch Airfield in Hampshire and was appointed Joint Managing Director.

He went on to manage and develop de Havilland's in various other parts of the world including South America. He retired as Managing Director of de Havilland's Airspeed Division in 1959, joined the board and became Deputy Chairman.

References 

1894 births
1976 deaths
De Havilland
Hereward
English aviators
Royal Flying Corps officers
British aviation record holders
20th-century English businesspeople